The Southern Intercollegiate Athletic Conference (SIAC) is a college athletic conference affiliated with the National Collegiate Athletic Association (NCAA) at the Division II level. Formed in 1913, it consists mostly of historically black colleges and universities (HBCUs), with all but one member located in the Southern United States.

The SIAC has led all NCAA Division II conferences in football attendance.

History

Only three charter members are still part of the conference—Clark Atlanta University (formerly Clark College), Tuskegee University, and Morehouse (which briefly left before returning). Before 2014, all members had been southern HBCUs, but four of the SIAC's five newest members include its only non-HBCU, Spring Hill College (joined in 2014), and its only member outside the South, Central State University of Ohio (joined in 2015). Their last three recent members were former member schools in their first stints: Savannah State University returned to the SIAC in 2019 after a 19-year absence, Allen University returned to the SIAC in 2020 after a 51-year absence, and Edward Waters University returned to the SIAC in 2021 after a nearly 86-year absence. The U.S. Army's 24th Infantry Division teams competed as members of the SIAC from 1930 until 1935.

On March 31, 2021, Paine College left the SIAC and the NCAA and joined the NCCAA.

Chronological timeline
 1913 - The Southern Intercollegiate Athletic Conference (SIAC) was founded as the Southeastern Intercollegiate Athletic Conference (SEIAC). Charter members involved Lincoln Junior College (now Alabama State University), Atlanta University, Clark College, Fisk University, Jackson College (now Jackson State University), Morris Brown College, Morehouse College, Talladega College and Tuskegee University beginning the 1913-14 academic year.
 1914 - Jackson State left the SIAC after spending just one season after the 1913-14 academic year.
 1920 - Florida Agricultural and Mechanical College (now Florida Agricultural and Mechanical University), Knoxville College and Tennessee Agricultural & Industrial State Normal College (now Tennessee State University) joined the SIAC in the 1920-21 academic year.
 1927 - Miles Memorial College (now Miles College) joined the SIAC in the 1927-28 academic year.
 1929 - Atlanta University left the SIAC after the 1928-29 academic year.
 1929 - The SEIAC has been rebranded as the Southern Intercollegiate Athletic Conference (SIAC) in the 1929-30 academic year.
 1929 - Lane College joined the SIAC in the 1929-30 academic year.
 1930 - Tennessee State left the SIAC after the 1929-30 academic year.
 1930 - Edward Waters College (now Edward Waters University) joined the SIAC in the 1930-31 academic year.
 1932 - Benedict College and LeMoyne College (now LeMoyne–Owen College) joined the SIAC in the 1932-33 academic year.
 1935 - Edward Waters left the SIAC after the 1934-35 academic year.
 1935 - The Normal Industrial Agricultural and Mechanical College of South Carolina (now South Carolina State University) and Xavier University of Louisiana joined the SIAC in the 1935-36 academic year.
 1941 - Talladega left the SIAC after the 1940-41 academic year.
 1941 - Fort Valley State College (now Fort Valley State University) joined the SIAC in the 1941-42 academic year.
 1947 - Alabama Agricultural and Mechanical College (now Alabama Agricultural and Mechanical University) and Allen University joined the SIAC in the 1947-48 academic year.
 1950 - Bethune–Cookman College (now Bethune–Cookman University) joined the SIAC in the 1950-51 academic year.
 1960 - Xavier (La.) left the SIAC after the 1959-60 academic year.
 1969 - Allen left the SIAC after the 1968-69 academic year.
 1969 - Albany State College (now Albany State University) and Savannah State College (now Savannah State University) joined the SIAC in the 1969-70 academic year.
 1971 - South Carolina State left the SIAC after the 1970-71 academic year.
 1976 - Alabama State left the SIAC after the 1975-76 academic year.
 1978 - Rust College and Stillman College joined the SIAC in the 1978-79 academic year.
 1979 - Bethune–Cookman and Florida A&M left the SIAC to join the MEAC after the 1978-79 academic year.
 1983 - Fisk left the SIAC after the 1982-83 academic year.
 1985 - Paine College joined the SIAC in the 1985-86 academic year.
 1988 - Rust left the SIAC after the 1987-88 academic year.
 1990 - Knoxville left the SIAC after the 1989-90 academic year.
 1997 - Kentucky State University joined the SIAC in the 1997-98 academic year.
 1998 - Alabama A&M left the SIAC to join Division I ranks of the National Collegiate Athletic Association (NCAA) and the Southwestern Athletic Conference (SWAC) after the 1997-98 academic year.
 1999 - Stillman left the SIAC to join the NCAA Division III ranks and the Great South Athletic Conference (GSAC) after the 1998-99 academic year.
 2000 - Morris Brown and Savannah State left the SIAC to become NCAA D-II Independents after the 1999-2000 academic year.
 2002 - Stillman re-joined the SIAC in the 2002-03 academic year.
 2008 - Claflin University joined the SIAC in the 2008-09 academic year.
 2013 - Central State University joined the SIAC as an associate member for football in the 2013 fall season (2013-14 academic year).
 2014 - Spring Hill College joined the SIAC in the 2014-15 academic year.
 2015 - Central State had upgraded to join the SIAC for all sports in the 2015-16 academic year.
 2016 - Stillman left the SIAC for a second time to join the Southern States Athletic Conference (SSAC) of the National Association of Intercollegiate Athletics (NAIA) ranks after the 2015-16 academic year.
 2018 - Claflin left the SIAC to join the Central Intercollegiate Athletic Association (CIAA) after the 2017-18 academic year.
 2019 - Savannah State re-joined the SIAC as a provisional member in the 2019-20 academic year.
 2020 - Allen re-joined the SIAC as a provisional member in the 2020-21 academic year (later full member status in 2022-23).
 2021 – Paine left the SIAC and the NCAA to join as an Independent within the National Christian Collegiate Athletic Association (NCCAA) after the 2020-21 academic year.
 2021 - Edward Waters re-joined the SIAC as a provisional member in the 2021-22 academic year (later full member status in 2022-23).

Member schools

Current members
The SIAC currently has 15 full members; all but five are private schools: 

Notes

Former members
The SIAC has 17 former full members, all but six were private schools: 

Notes

Membership timeline

Conference facilities

Conference sports
The SIAC currently sponsors 14 sports, eight for men and six for women. Men's volleyball became the 14th SIAC sport in the 2020–21 school year; play was intended to start in January 2021 but was delayed to 2022 due to COVID-19 issues.

Men's sponsored sports by school

Women's sponsored sports by school

Other sponsored sports by school

Championships

Commissioner's All-Sports

Men's sports
Last three years of champions.

Golf returned as a conference sport in 2008. The first SIAC Intercollegiate Golf Championship was held at Tuskegee in 1938. The SIAC stopped Golf as a sport due to World War II but restarted in 1947 as an official conference sport until 1980 when golf was discontinued.

Women's sports
Last three years of champions.

See also

Pioneer Bowl

References

External links